Samuel John Woods (born 11 September 1998) is an English professional footballer who plays as a midfielder for  club Barnet.

Early life
Woods was born on 11 September 1998 and supported Crystal Palace as a child.

Career
Woods began his youth career with Crystal Palace and worked his way through the club's academy programme. He made his senior debut on 31 October 2018 as a 78th-minute substitute for Pape Souaré in an away 0–1 defeat to Middlesbrough in a fourth round EFL Cup tie. He made his first senior start on 27 August 2019 in a home 0–0 draw in the same competition against Colchester United, which Palace lost after a penalty shoot-out.

In October 2019, Woods signed a contract extension until June 2021.

On 22 January 2020, Woods signed on loan with Hamilton Academical until the end of the 2019–20 season. He scored on his debut, on 25 January, in a 4–2 loss at home to Livingston.

On 31 January 2021, Woods signed on loan with Plymouth Argyle until the end of the 2020–21 season. Woods contract expired and he left Crystal Palace, after the 2020–21 season.

In October 2021, Woods signed for  club Barnet. He joined Cheshunt on loan in September 2022.

Career statistics

References 

1998 births
Living people
Association football defenders
Crystal Palace F.C. players
Hamilton Academical F.C. players
Plymouth Argyle F.C. players
Scottish Professional Football League players
National League (English football) players 
English footballers
Barnet F.C. players
Cheshunt F.C. players